Irlande is a municipality in Les Appalaches Regional County Municipality in the Chaudière-Appalaches region of Quebec, Canada. Its population was 884 as of the Canada 2016 Census.

Irlande does not have a town or village centre, but the hamlet of Maple Grove, at the intersection of Chemins Craig and Gosford, constitutes the only notable urban agglomeration. This is where the Holy Trinity Anglican Church and the rectory are located.

Name
The township of Ireland was first colonized by Irish settlers, who called the area "New Ireland." The municipality kept the English spelling until 1987, when it took the French "Irlande". "Irlande" is the French name for Ireland.

References

Commission de toponymie du Québec
Ministère des Affaires municipales, des Régions et de l'Occupation du territoire 

Incorporated places in Chaudière-Appalaches
Irish diaspora in Quebec
Municipalities in Quebec